Recombo DNA is a collection of studio demos and unreleased tracks by the American new wave band Devo. It was originally released in 2000 by Rhino Entertainment's Rhino Handmade label and limited to 5,000 copies.

Background 
Recombo DNA is culled from cassettes, reel-to-reel tapes, multi-tracks and DATs from the Devo archives, with an emphasis on recordings that had not previously been illicitly circulated, augmented with some sonically upgraded versions of tracks that had previously leaked. The recordings span the era following the band's first independently released singles to the year prior to their signing with Enigma Records.

On August 11, 2017, Futurismo Records reissued Recombo DNA on quadruple vinyl with additional material and new artwork. For this LP edition, "Somewhere With Devo" was removed from the main track listing, retitled "The Somewhere Suite" and included on a 3-inch Mini CD, a release which had been originally planned for May 1989.

"The Somewhere Suite" is in six parts, and an original advertisement from 1989, reproduced inside the LP reissue, labels them as follows:

Part 1 DEPARTURE: Search for Somewhere / Somewhere (Prelude) / Somewhere
Part 2 RECRUITMENT: First Stop the Orient (Society's Fools) / Second Stop Africa (Something Else) / Third Stop Europa (Are You Ready?)
Part 3 BATTLE FOR THE MIND ITSELF
Part 4 VICTORY PARADE
Part 5 FINALE: Somewhere (Refrain) / Shot Into Space...
Part 6 I'M A DISCO DANCER WITH NOWHERE TO GO

Track listing
Notes adapted from liner notes of original 2000 Rhino Handmade edition.

2000 Rhino Handmade CD edition

2017 Futurismo LP edition
The bonus tracks for this edition appear below in italics.

Personnel

Devo
Mark Mothersbaugh – vocals, keyboards, guitars
Gerald V. Casale – vocals, bass, keyboards
Bob Mothersbaugh – lead guitar, vocals
Bob Casale – rhythm guitar, keyboards, vocals
Alan Myers – drums (1976–1985)
David Kendrick – drums (1986–1987)
Jim Mothersbaugh – drums (1974–1976)

Technical
Devo – original recording producers
Roland Worthington Hand – compilation producer
Josh Mancell – compilation assistance, tape research
Rectangle Van Elk – curator assistant
D K Baker – deputy chief archivist
Kanona Nooksack — archival assistance
Dan Hersch – remastering
Bill Inglot – remastering
Bryan Lasley – art direction, design
Patrick Pending – art direction assistant, design assistant
Devo, Inc – artwork, photography
John Tremblay – photography
Barbara Watson – photography
Janet Macoska – photography
Hugh Brown – photography

References

Devo compilation albums
2000 compilation albums
Rhino Handmade compilation albums